Simon Jacob Schermerhorn (September 25, 1827 – July 21, 1901) was an American politician who served one term as a United States representative from New York from 1893 to 1895.

Biography 
Born in Rotterdam, Schenectady County, New York, he attended the common schools and engaged in agricultural pursuits.

Political career 
He was supervisor of the town of Rotterdam in 1856, and served two terms as school commissioner; in 1862 and 1865 he was a member of the New York State Assembly. He was a director and trustee in local banks.

Congress 
He was elected as a Democrat to the Fifty-third Congress, holding office from March 4, 1893 to March 3, 1895. He was not a candidate for renomination in 1894.

Retirement and death
After leaving Congress, he retired to his farm in Rotterdam. He died there in 1901; interment was in Viewland Cemetery.

References

1827 births
1901 deaths
Simon
American people of Dutch descent
Democratic Party members of the New York State Assembly
People from Rotterdam, New York
Democratic Party members of the United States House of Representatives from New York (state)
19th-century American politicians